Filthy Rich and Homeless is a Logie Award-winning Australian TV documentary series produced by Blackfella Films and broadcast in 2017 (Season 1) and 2018 (Season 2) on SBS.

The series follows five wealthy Australians who swap their life of privilege for homelessness.

Series overview

Season 1
The five participants were self-made millionaire Tim Guest; Kayla Fenech, daughter of boxing champion Jeff Fenech; rags to riches beauty entrepreneur Jellaine Dee; third generation pub baron Stu Laundy; and model and Sydney socialite Christian Wilkins, son of television presenter Richard Wilkins.

Season 2
The five participants were socialite Skye Leckie, wife of media company executive director David Leckie; actor-broadcaster Cameron Daddo; author Benjamin Law; politician and activist Alex Greenwich; and Instagram star Alli Simpson.

Season 3
The five participants were Dr. Andrew Rochford, Deputy Lord Mayor of Melbourne Arron Wood,  Restaurateur Pauline Nguyen, Comedian Ciaran Lyons, and Model Ellie Gonsalves.

See also 
 Go Back to Where You Came From
 First Contact

References

External links 
 Filthy Rich and Homeless – SBS site
 Blackfella Films

Special Broadcasting Service original programming
2010s Australian documentary television series
2017 Australian television series debuts
2018 Australian television series endings
Homelessness